Thiago Vecino Berriel (born 25 February 1999) is a Uruguayan professional footballer who plays as a forward.

Club career
An academy graduate of Nacional, Vecino played an important part in his team's triumph at 2018 U-20 Copa Libertadores. He scored three goals from five matches in the tournament, including a brace against Sport Huancayo.

Vecino made his professional debut for Nacional on 17 August 2019, in a 1–1 draw against River Plate Montevideo. He played whole 90 minutes in the match and scored his team's only goal.

Career statistics

Honours
Nacional
Uruguayan Primera División: 2019, 2020

Nacional U20
U-20 Copa Libertadores: 2018

Individual
 Uruguayan Primera División Team of the Year: 2022

References

External links
 

Uruguayan footballers
Living people
1999 births
Association football forwards
Club Nacional de Football players